LY-334370 is a selective 5-HT1F receptor agonist which was under development by Eli Lilly and Company for the treatment of migraine headaches.  The drug showed efficacy in a phase II clinical trial but further development was halted due to toxicity detected in animals.

See also
 CP-135807
 Lasmiditan
 SN-22

References

External links
 

5-HT1F agonists
Eli Lilly and Company brands
Indoles
Piperidines
Benzamides
Fluoroarenes
Abandoned drugs